Lucid Records is an independent record label in Illinois, run by Chris Broach of Braid, The Firebird Band, & L' Spaerow.

Overview 
Lucid Records is a record label owned by Chris Broach.

The label's first release was in 2002 with The Blackouts' debut album Everyday is a Sunday Evening

Lucid Records is exclusively distributed via The Orchard.

Lucid artists

Active
Thunderlip
Of The Opera
Lokbrá
Life at Sea
Kerbloki
The Firebird Band
Chris Broach
The Blakhiv
The Blackouts (now known as The Living Blue)

Former 
The International Theatre of War
L'Spaerow
Monday's Hero
The Silent Treatment
Spain Colored Orange
The Tiniest Unicorn

See also
 List of record labels
 Chicago record labels

References

External links
 Lucid Records Website

American independent record labels
Rock record labels
Electronic music record labels
Record labels established in 2002
2002 establishments in Illinois